The Cathedral of Córdoba (Our Lady of the Assumption) is the colonial cathedral church of the Roman Catholic Archdiocese of Córdoba, Argentina, and the oldest church in continuous service in Argentina.

This ecclesiastical temple is the oldest intact and functional colonial construction in Argentina.

Thus, this building is one of the most valuable architectural heritage in Argentina. For these reasons it is a National Historic Monument, three blocks from the Jesuit Block, which is a World Heritage Site in accordance with the UNESCO.

Location
The cathedral of the city of Córdoba is located in the historic center of the city, which practically coincides with the geographical center of the city; its southeast angle (which is taken as a direction reference) faces the corner of Independencia and 27 de Abril streets.

It occupies the wide block that faces the west side of Plaza San Martín (former Plaza Mayor), on its north side the great church is separated from the Cabildo by an old alley called Santa Catalina, the back of the temple faces the Rivera Indarte street, its main façade is oriented to the east-south-east, which is unique in the churches of its time since they had to have the main altar facing Jerusalem (in this case, it should be to the northeast, although it is located to the northwest).

To the north, in front of the back of the Cathedral, is the small but historic Plazoleta del Fundador with a patinated bronze sculpture representing Jerónimo Luis de Cabrera standing.

History 

The building itself was begun in 1582 with the name -which it still bears- of Church of Our Lady of the Assumption. In 1598 the master builder Gregorio Ferreira and the stonemason Juan Rodríguez undertook the construction of the building with sufficiently solid materials (stone, bricks and lime). In 1601, the carpenter Mateo Domínguez undertook the work of making a framework of slats and beams for the roof, while Hernando Álvarez was commissioned to supervise the manufacture of 30,000 "muslera" roof tiles, The direction of the work was entrusted shortly after to the Granadan architect Ricardo González Merguete who made various plans; The works gained a strong impetus thanks to the architects and Jesuits. Giovanni Battista Primoli designed the main floor plan (Latin cross of the basilica type) following the model of the almost contemporary Jesuit Church of the Gesù in Rome.

In 1706 the cathedral was officially consecrated.

In 1758, the Franciscan friar Vicente Muñoz designed and directed the construction of the dome with lantern towers. More than half a century after it began, the façade was designed and completed by Andrea Bianchi in 1729.
 
On May 18, 1758, the building was practically finished, with the naves, the narthex, the great dome, the crossings, and the great Neoclassical portico preceded by a wide staircase and closed by an artistic wrought iron portal, work exquisite workmanship in which you can see the silhouettes of Saint Peter and Saint Paul, although the two large bell towers were only finished in 1787. The large entrance door, like the choir stalls around the main altar, are Jesuit works carved in missionary cedar. The tower clock is a gift from the English railway at the end of the 19th century.

In 1901 the statue of Christ the Redeemer was added to the top of the façade, such a sculpture was forged in the Paucelae Coquet foundry in Paris, France.

The narthex of the cathedral, and adjacent crypts, would be the burial site for a number of prominent figures in the history of Córdoba Province, and the nation's. Some of these include General José María Paz (and his wife, Margarita Weild), Dean Gregorio Funes, Bishop Hernando de Trejo y Sanabria (the first rector of the University of Córdoba, the oldest in Argentina), and Friar Mamerto Esquiú.

The ornate interior, overlooked by the sterling silver altar crafted in Upper Peru (Colonial Bolivia), also includes a church tabernacle donated to the cathedral in 1804, as well as an extensive collection of silver and gold votive offerings. The interior was later decorated with frescoes and murals painted in the early years of the 20th century by Emilio Caraffa, Carlos Camilloni, and Manuel Cardeñosa.

Main features 

Its interior is beautiful: the great central nave roofed with a high continuous barrel vault is profusely and harmoniously embellished by a large number of carved wood and gilt moldings -many of them in the gold leaf-, the main altar makes a balanced game with the high columns and the ancient sculptures that represent various Catholic saints. Such sculptures, each one separately, turn out to be valuable works of art (many of them are articulated and are dressed in sumptuous clothing).

Sunlight enters mainly through a series of deep lunettes located in the vault of the central nave. The mentioned basilica-type central nave is elevated with respect to the two side naves, from which it is separated by tall and wide columns, largely golden, in the box located above the narthex there is a pipe organ.

As for the main towers, they have chimes, the tower located in the southeast corner is equipped with a large clock. In the corners of the towers you can see, sculpted, curious figures in an attitude of playing trumpets and dressed in indigenous attire.

Shortly after crossing the portico, the visitor enters the spacious narthex where the tombs in which the remains of José María Paz and his wife Margarita Weild lie, are also found in the urn that keeps the remains of Dean Gregorio Funes, in the crypts lie the remains of Bishop Fernando Trexo y Senabria -first rector of the first Argentine university: currently called UNC- and of Friar Mamerto Esquiú, on November 7, 2011 the presumable remains of Juan Bautista Bustos were transferred from the Church of Santo Domingo in the city of Santa Fe to the city of Córdoba and deposited with honors in the cathedral church.

The main altar is largely elaborately made with embossed silver from Colonial Bolivia.

The dome is located at the intersection of the central nave with the crossing. The first thing that attracts attention are the proportions of its dome and its elaborate decoration. It is an imposing dome due to its elevation and the conceptual audacity with which it was made: it is flanked by four octagonal turrets (which structurally serve as reinforcements).

In the dome, from below and upwards, on the outer side, pairs of columns that end in a cornice are perceived, from the same they climb, through the curve of the dome, large fins with the appearance of inverted corbels which are crowned by pinnacles pyramidal.

In the intercolumns of the dome there are large windows with curvilinear shapes.

The dome is covered by ribs in the form of segments that are continued by small columns resting on an archway, on such an archway, crowning the whole set is a graceful lantern, this is a turret adorned with pilasters, pinnacles and windows, the lantern It is closed by a bulbiform dome that culminates in a large weather vane that represents the chalice and the cross.

The total set of the Argentine cathedral of Córdoba is an excellent synthesis of elements with Renaissance origins combined with those of the Spanish colonial Baroque, Neoclassicism and even Mudéjar details.

The treasure of this cathedral would deserve a separate chapter, due to the accumulation of ex-vows (mainly silver and gold pieces) and jewels donated by wealthy faithful or by urban collections: silver crosiers with gold details, silver and gold crowns embroidered with diamonds and pearls to "dress" the statues of the Virgin, a large tabernacle donated in 1804, brocaded silk shawls, etc. Part of the cathedral treasury has been looted during the last quarter of the 20th century.

Gallery

See also
 List of tallest structures built before the 20th century

Notes

References

Roman Catholic cathedrals in Argentina
Buildings and structures in Córdoba, Argentina
Roman Catholic churches completed in 1787
National Historic Monuments of Argentina
Tourist attractions in Córdoba Province, Argentina
1582 establishments in the Spanish Empire
18th-century Roman Catholic church buildings in Argentina
Baroque church buildings in Argentina